A posterior or subscapular group of six or seven glands is placed along the lower margin of the posterior wall of the axilla in the course of the subscapular artery.

The afferents of this group drain the skin and muscles of the lower part of the back of the neck and of the posterior thoracic wall; their efferents pass to the central group of axillary glands.

Additional images

References 

Lymphatics of the upper limb